Ostholstein-Mitte is an Amt ("collective municipality") in the district of Ostholstein, in Schleswig-Holstein, Germany. It is situated north of Neustadt in Holstein. The seat of the Amt is the village Schönwalde am Bungsberg.

The Amt Ostholstein-Mitte consists of the following municipalities (population in 2005 between brackets):

Altenkrempe (1,121) 
Kasseedorf (1,587) 
Schashagen (2,502) 
Schönwalde am Bungsberg* (2,557) 
Sierksdorf (1,591)

Ämter in Schleswig-Holstein